This is a list of members of the Tasmanian House of Assembly between the 1877 elections and the 1882 elections.

Notes
 In August 1877, William Moore, the member for Wellington, resigned to successfully contest the Mersey seat in the Legislative Council. William Giblin, the immediate former member for Central Hobart, the resulting by-election on 28 August 1877. 
 In July 1878, Samuel Tulloch, the member for South Launceston, resigned. James Scott, the former member for George Town, won the resulting by-election on 22 July 1878.
 In July 1878, Charles Bromby, the member for Norfolk Plains, resigned. Andrew Inglis Clark won the resulting by-election on 26 July 1878.
 In November 1878, Robert Gayer, the member for Queenborough, resigned. Edward Crowther won the resulting by-election on 26 November 1878.
 In November 1878, Philip Fysh, the member for East Hobart, resigned. John Dodds won the resulting by-election on 26 November 1878.
 In December 1878, George Gilmore, the member for George Town, resigned. Audley Coote won the resulting by-election on 11 January 1879.
 In June 1879, Charles Meredith, the member for West Devon, resigned. Edward Braddon won the resulting by-election on 31 July 1879.
 In April 1880, Samuel Henry, the member for Deloraine, resigned. William Sleigh won the resulting by-election on 24 April 1880.
 In May 1880, John Whitehead, the member for Deloraine, resigned. James Cox won the resulting by-election on 27 May 1880.
 On 16 November 1880, John Mitchell, the member for Glamorgan, died. John Lyne won the resulting by-election on 8 December 1880.
 On 13 December 1880, John Balfe, the member for West Hobart, died. William Burgess won the resulting by-election on 5 January 1881.
 In June 1881, William Hodgson, the member for Richmond, resigned to contest the Pembroke seat in the Legislative Council. Charles Bromby won the resulting by-election on 16 July 1881.

Sources
 Parliament of Tasmania (2006). The Parliament of Tasmania from 1856

Members of Tasmanian parliaments by term
19th-century Australian politicians